Orphninae is a subfamily of beetles in the scarab beetle family, Scarabaeidae. There are two tribes in the family, the New World Aegidiini and the Old World Orphnini. They are mostly tropical beetles.

As of 2013 there are about 195 species in the subfamily. They are classified in 15 genera: 4 in the tribe Aegidiini and 11 in the Orphnini. In addition, the genus Stenosternus is provisionally placed in the Aegidiini.

Taxonomy
Taxa include:
Tribe Aegidiini
Genus Aegidiellus
Genus Aegidium
Genus Aegidinus
Genus Paraegidium
Genus Stenosternus
Tribe Orphnini
Genus Madecorphnus
Genus Pseudorphnus
Genus Renorphnus
Genus Triodontus

References

External links
Key to New World Orphninae Genera. Generic Guide to New World Scarab Beetles. University of Nebraska State Museum.

Scarabaeidae